A distinct entity from Republican Left of Catalonia
The Republican Left is a Spanish republican political party. Founded in 1977, it considers itself as the heir to Manuel Azaña's Republican Left. Its contemporary presence is now limited to a handful of local councillors.

The party describes itself as a republican, federal, radical, secular, pacifist and environmentalist party. It maintains close links with the Nonviolent Radical Party.

Dictator Francisco Franco's death in 1975 allowed for the founding of new political parties. Republican Left was formed in 1977 and in April 1986 became a founding member of the United Left electoral alliance, which it broke away from in 2002. It participated in the 2004 election, winning 0.07% of the vote. It rejoined United Left in 2011.

See also
Liberalism and radicalism in Spain
Republicanism in Spain

References

External links
Official site

1977 establishments in Spain
Liberal parties in Spain
Political parties established in 1977
Radical parties
Republican parties in Spain
United Left (Spain)